Magdalene Catholic College is an independent Roman Catholic co-educational secondary day school located in Smeaton Grange, in the Macarthur region of outer south-western Sydney, New South Wales, Australia. The current principal is David Cloran (2023 - present).

History
Magdalene Catholic High School was established in 1999 by the Roman Catholic Diocese of Wollongong in a temporary location at Mater Dei near Camden with 90 students and 7 teaching staff. The school was built to serve Parishes of the south-western Macarthur Region, specifically Camden, Narellan, Mount Annan and The Oaks.

A  parcel of land was bought from the Patrician Brothers in Smeaton Grange. This land was previously used as a novitiate and retreat centre. In 2000 the School migrated to this new site, occupying the existing buildings. During 2001 the first of five construction stages had completed, and students were able to start moving into the first permanent buildings. By 2004 all five construction stages had completed, this was also when the first Year 12 cohort sat the Higher School Certificate examinations.

Overview
In 2005 Magdalene Catholic High School deployed an AutoCell-based wireless network, a new wireless network technology that had previously been deployed at the University of Canberra and set itself up as a leader in technology across the Diocese.

In 2014 the School were runners-up in the International F1 in Schools Challenge, a competition which saw the "Gamma Raycing Team" (a team of six students) win at State, National and then place second in Dubai, United Arab Emirates.

The School says that it ‘continues to value its commitment to social justice and there is a vast range of projects which the school has been involved in’ - But this is in some cases not true. As a current and past students have acknowledged, that the school is more concerned about how they look online compared to how they support their students. They encourage students to take up these opportunities, but they do not have any support for them during challenging times.

These include close links with Mater Dei, St Vincent de Paul Society, Carrington Aged Care, 24 Hour Fight Against Cancer as well as multiple projects as part of the Duke of Edinburgh Scheme.

Principals
The following individuals have served as College Principal:

References

External links
 Magdalene Catholic College Website

Catholic secondary schools in New South Wales
Educational institutions established in 1999
1999 establishments in Australia
Roman Catholic Diocese of Wollongong
Macarthur (New South Wales)